Thomas Kenny (1933 – 7 February 2021) was an Irish sports administrator who was the second president of the Ladies' Gaelic Football Association, a position he held from 1977 until 1979.

Biography

An Offaly native, Tommy Kenny spent his entire working life with the ESB in Ferbane Power Station. His administrative career began in earnest when he served as secretary with local clubs St Saran's and Belmont, and he was an Offaly County Board delegate for many years. Regarded as one of the founding fathers of the Ladies' Gaelic Football Association, Kenny served as LGFA President for two years. He was also a selector on Offaly minor and under-21 teams during the 1970s and 1980s, with two Leinster under-21 titles achieved.

Kenny died on 7 February 2021.

References

1933 births
2021 deaths
Date of birth missing
ESB people
People from County Offaly
Presidents of the Ladies' Gaelic Football Association